There are several runestones located in the Tensta parish of Uppland, Sweden, which are sometimes described as being a Tensta runestone. These runestones, which were inscribed during the Viking Age, include:
Uppland Runic Inscription 1034
Uppland Runic Inscription 1035
Uppland Runic Inscription 1036
Uppland Runic Inscription 1037
Uppland Runic Inscription 1038
Uppland Runic Inscription 1039
Uppland Runic Inscription 1040
Uppland Runic Inscription 1041
Uppland Runic Inscription 1042
Uppland Runic Inscription 1043
Uppland Runic Inscription 1044

Tensta runestone may also refer to a stone in Tensta, Stockholm:
The runestone at Spånga Church (U 61)

Tensta runestone